is a city located in Aomori Prefecture, Japan. , the city had an estimated population of 221,229 in 110,195 households, and a population density of 720 persons per km2. making it Aomori Prefecture's second largest city by population.

Geography 
Hachinohe is located in the flatlands on the southeast coast of Aomori Prefecture, facing the Pacific Ocean. Both the Oirase River and the Mabechi River flow through Hachinohe. A portion of the coastal areas of the city were within the borders of the Tanesashi Kaigan Hashikamidake Prefectural Natural Park, which was incorporated into the Sanriku Fukkō National Park in 2013.

Neighbouring municipalities 
Aomori Prefecture
Sannohe District
Hashikami
Gonohe
Nanbu
Kamikita District
Oirase
Iwate Prefecture
Karumai

Demographics
Per Japanese census data:

Climate
Hachinohe has a humid continental climate (Köppen Dfa), with warm summers and cold and snowy winters.  Summers are considerably milder than in other parts of Honshu because the city is very close to the open sea, while winters if distinctly cold are much less snowy than in Aomori city or Sapporo or Wakkanai, although snowfall is higher than in Kushiro. The average annual temperature in Hachinohe is 9.9 °C. The average annual rainfall is 1165 mm with September as the wettest month. The temperatures are highest on average in August, at around 22.7 °C, and lowest in January, at around -1.9 °C.

History
The area around Hachinohe has been occupied since prehistoric times, and was a major population center for the Emishi people. Numerous Jōmon period remains have been discovered within the borders of Hachinohe. The area was nominally under control of the Northern Fujiwara in the Heian period, and became part of the holdings granted to the Nanbu clan after the defeat of the North Fujiwara by Minamoto no Yoritomo in the Kamakura period. The Nanbu established numerous horse ranches, accompanied by numbered fortified settlements. During the Edo period, it was initially part of Morioka Domain, but in 1664 the Tokugawa shogunate authorized the creation of a separate 20,000 koku Hachinohe Domain for a junior line of the Nanbu clan. The town prospered as a castle town centered on Hachinohe Castle, and served as a small commercial centre and port for the fishing grounds off southeastern Hokkaido. Today, the port still serves the fishing industry and a number of international cargo vessels.

After the Meiji Restoration, Hachinohe Domain was abolished, and replaced by Hachinohe Prefecture, which was subsequently merged into Aomori Prefecture. Initially, there was a debate as to whether the capital of newly formed Aomori Prefecture should be at Hachinohe or Hirosaki; however, due to strong rivalry between the former Nanbu domain and former Tsugaru Domain, the Meiji government decided to build a new town called Aomori in a central location, and to designate it as the capital of the prefecture.

Per the Meiji period establishment of the modern municipalities system on April 1, 1889, the town of Hachinohe was created within Sannohe District. In 1901, it merged with neighboring Chōja, and on May 1, 1929, with neighboring Konakano, Minato and Same villages to form the city of Hachinohe. The city further expanded by annexing the village of Shimonaganawashiro in 1942, Korekawa in 1954, Ichikawa, Kaminaganawashiro, Tachi and Toyosaki in 1955 and Odate in 1958.

On March 31, 2005, the village of Nangō (from Sannohe District) was also merged into Hachinohe.

During the American occupation of Japan following World War II, a United States Army base, Camp Haugen, was located in Hachinohe, and was the home of the Seventh Division. An Armed Forces Radio Service radio station was located on the base; it was known as AFRS Hachinohe. In 1950, after the North Korean invasion of South Korea, troops from Camp Haugen left for Korea. AFRS Hachinohe altered its broadcasts to include coverage of South Korea so Americans could benefit from its news and entertainment programs. With the final withdrawal of American forces from Hachinohe in 1956, the base was turned over to the Japan Ground Self-Defense Force and was officially re-designated JGSDF Camp Hachinohe.

In March 2011, the city was one of those hit by the 2011 Japanese tsunami. The tsunami tossed many huge fishing boats ashore and heavily damaged the port area.  About 100 homes were destroyed.  Divers from the United States Navy ship Safeguard joined with Japanese workers to help clear the port to facilitate the delivery of relief supplies via the city.

On January 1, 2017, Hachinohe was given core city status, with increased local autonomy.

Government
Hachinohe has a mayor-council form of government with a directly elected mayor and a unicameral city legislature of 32 members. Hachinohe contributes eight members to the Aomori Prefectural Assembly. In terms of national politics, the town is part of Aomori 2nd district of the lower house of the Diet of Japan.

Economy
Hachinohe is the largest city in eastern Aomori Prefecture, and serves as the regional industrial and commercial center. Commercial fishing still plays a major role in the local economy, with Hachinohe port having one of the largest volumes of landed fish in Japan. However, since its designation as a new industrial city in 1964, Hachinohe has developed a large coastal industrial belt with a diverse range of chemical, steel, cement and fertilizer products. Major industrial parks include the Hachinohe High Tech Park and Hachinohe North-Interchange Industrial Complex. The Hachinohe Thermal Power Station, an LNG-fired power plant operated by Tohoku Electric is located in the city. Hachinohe Port is a major international port for northern Japan.

Education

Colleges and universities
Hachinohe Gakuin University
Hachinohe Institute of Technology
Hachinohe Gakuin Junior College

Primary and secondary education
Hachinohe has 42 public elementary schools and 24 public junior high schools operated by the city government, and two private middle schools. The city has eight public high schools operated by the Aomori Prefectural Board of Education, and one public high school operated by the national government. There are also eight private high schools. The city also has three special education schools.

Transportation

Railway
 East Japan Railway Company (JR East) - Tōhoku Shinkansen
  
 East Japan Railway Company (JR East) - Hachinohe Line
  -  -  - ,  -  -  -  -  -  - 
  Aoimori Railway Company - Aoimori Railway Line
 -  - 
Hachinohe Rinkai Railway (freight only)

Highway

Seaports
Port of Hachinohe

Local attractions

Traditional handicrafts
 Yawata-uma, a wooden horse with gold saddle markings and a decorative plume attached to its head. The Hachinohe area has been known since the Kamakura period for its breed of war horses. Also, farming horses have supported the lives of the commoners and have often been used as the theme for dances and folk tales. The art of Yawata-uma figurines is a regional art form and popular souvenir.

Local sights

Kabushima is an island offshore Hachinohe which also serves as a habitat for forty thousand black-tailed gulls, or umineko. It is a national Natural Monument. It also has a shinto shrine.
Tanesashi Coast a nationally designated Place of Scenic Beauty.
Kushihiki Hachimangū
Yomasari Dam

Local festivals
Emburi is a citywide festival which is also celebrated in nearby towns. The object of the festival is to pray for a bountiful harvest in the coming year. It originated as a dance with an agricultural tool (the eburi; enburi is a local pronunciation), which was used to teach people how to cultivate the land. Nowadays it is a parade of 15-20 people, with 3-5 dancers and a singer accompanied by wooden flutes, drums and bells. The festival takes place February 17–20, and marks the official end of the long, harsh winter.
Hachinohe Sansha Taisai is another citywide festival and is considered to be the main festival of the town. It is also billed as "Japan's Biggest Float Festival". Sansha means "three shrines" and Taisai means "festival": It is held by three Shinto shrines: Ogami Jinja, Shinra Jinja, and Shinmei-gu. Floats proceed through the main streets of the city, accompanied by people with drums, flutes and loud calls. 27 different floats are used, and they are proudly constructed and flourished by the members of various organizations, such as schools and the city hall. The floats are also accompanied by men in samurai costumes on horseback, and tiger dancers. On the second and third days of the festival, a traditional game of a sport similar to polo is held at the stables of Shinra Shrine. This sport (加賀美流騎馬打毬 Kaga Biryū Kiba Dakyū) is officially an "intangible cultural asset" of Aomori Prefecture. Sansha Taisai takes place from July 31 to August 4 every year.

National Historic Sites
Chōshichiyachi Shell Mound, Jōmon period ruins
Korekawa Site, Jōmon period ruins 
Tangotai Kofun cluster, Kofun period tumuli 
Ne Castle, Muromachi period castle ruins

Other
The sound of the umi-neko at Hachinohe was selected by the Ministry of the Environment as one of the 100 Soundscapes of Japan.

Sports
Vanraure Hachinohe, J-League soccer team
Tohoku Free Blades, Asia League Ice Hockey team

Sister city relations
 Federal Way, Washington, United States
 Lanzhou, Gansu, China since April 1998

Notable people from Hachinohe

Saeko Chiba, voice actress
Miki Furukawa, musician, and former bass guitarist and singer for the Japanese rock band Supercar
Kengo Hanazawa, manga artist
Chiharu Icho, freestyle wrestler
Kaori Icho, freestyle wrestler
Masako Katsuki, voice actress
Hitomi Obara, freestyle wrestler
Tadamori Oshima, politician
Marimo Ragawa, manga artist

Other
There is a main-belt asteroid named Hachinohe.

References

External links

 Official Website 

 
Cities in Aomori Prefecture
Port settlements in Japan
Populated coastal places in Japan